Ian "Bull" Turnbull (born December 22, 1953) is a Canadian former professional ice hockey defenceman who played ten seasons in the National Hockey League from 1973–74 until 1982–83. He and Börje Salming combined to make one of the best 1–2 defensive punches in Toronto Maple Leafs history during the 1970s.

Turnbull played 628 career NHL games, scoring 123 goals and 317 assists for 440 points. In his best offensive season, (1976–77 while with the Maple Leafs), he set career highs with 22 goals, 57 assists, 79 points, and a +47 plus/minus rating. The 79 points still stands over 40 years later as the Maple Leaf team record for most points in a season by a defenceman. He also still holds the NHL record for most goals in a game by a defenceman, with 5 in a game on February 2, 1977, in a 9–1 victory against the Detroit Red Wings. Turnbull only had five shots in the game, making him the first player in NHL history to score five goals on five shots. Turnbull was outstanding in the 1978 playoff series against the New York Islanders, eventually won by Toronto 4 games to 3, anchoring the team’s defensive corps after an eye injury forced all-star defenceman Börje Salming out of the Maple Leafs line-up.

Turnbull is currently the IT Director at Martin Chevrolet in Torrance, California, United States.

Career statistics

Honors and awards
 OHA-Jr 2nd All-Star Team: 1972, 1973
 NHL All-Star Game: 1977
 2018 J. P. Bickell Memorial Award

See also
 List of players with 5 or more goals in an NHL game

References

External links
Biography at hockeydraftcentral.com
Profile at mapleleafslegends
Career stats at couchpotatohockey.com

1953 births
Living people
Anglophone Quebec people
Baltimore Skipjacks players
Canadian ice hockey defencemen
Ice hockey people from Montreal
Los Angeles Kings players
Montreal Junior Canadiens players
National Hockey League first-round draft picks
New Haven Nighthawks players
Ottawa 67's players
Pittsburgh Penguins players
Toronto Maple Leafs draft picks
Toronto Maple Leafs players
Vancouver Blazers draft picks